Sumarokov is a Russian masculine surname, its feminine counterpart is Sumarokova. It may refer to
 Alexander Sumarokov (1717–1777), Russian poet and playwright
 Ekaterina Kniazhnina (née Sumarokova, 1746–1797), Russian poet, daughter of Alexander
 Tatyana Sumarokova (1922–1977), aviator
 Felix Sumarokov-Elston (1820–1877), Russian general and administrator
 Mikhail Sumarokov-Elston (1894–1970), Russian tennis player

Russian-language surnames